Shape of Despair is a funeral doom metal band from Finland.

History
The band was founded in 1995 as Raven by Jarno Salomaa (guitars, later also keyboards), Tomi Ullgrén (bass, later also guitars) and Toni "Otso" Mäensivu (drums, later also vocals) as a faster, instrumental black metal influenced band following the footsteps of their contemporaries like Strid, Burzum, Darkthrone and Unholy. The trio soon realized that the music they played was not as good as they would have wanted, lacking the atmosphere and emotion of the bands that influenced them. During the summer of 1995 Raven recorded their rehearsals with a simple cassette recorder, capturing all the songs that later became the Alone In The Mist demo, for the first time on tape. After listening to the rehearsal tape and realizing they actually had something in their hands they could stand behind, Raven wanted to record the tracks in a proper studio. It took the band three years to do it. Raven entered Arkki-studio in early 1998. They still had not tried any vocals until the very last minute, when they decided they wanted to test how the songs would sound with Mäensivu's vocals and were surprised how well they actually fit.  
The Alone In The Mist demo was not released until 2016, when the band thought it was the proper time to do it. They changed their name in September 1998 to Shape Of Despair. The decision to change the name came down to basically not wanting to be confused with the UK hard rock stalwarts Raven. They believed their new moniker fit their new sound better too.

In 2000 they signed a deal with Spikefarm Records and released their debut album Shades of... with Samu Ruotsalainen on drums.

The second album Angels of Distress, released in September 2001, featured Pasi Koskinen on lead vocals. Sami Uusitalo joined up in 2002 to play bass for the third album Illusion's Play. It was released in 2004.

In 2005, the band released a compilation titled Shape of Despair, featuring rare and unreleased material from the group, including tracks from the band's first demo Alone in the Mist and a new song called Sleeping Murder, recorded over a four-day period at Sundicoop Studios in Savonlinna, Finland. After a 5-year lull the band released the EP Written in My Scars and a split EP with Before The Rain.

Their 4th full-length album Monotony Fields was released on June 15, 2015, by Season of Mist.

Members

Current members
 Jarno Salomaa – lead guitars (1995–present), keyboards (1998–present)
 Tomi Ullgrén – rhythm guitars (1998–present), bass (1995–2002)
 Natalie Koskinen (formerly known as Natalie Safrosskin) – vocals (1998–present)
 Sami Uusitalo – bass (2002–present)
 Henri Koivula – vocals (2011–present)
 Samu Ruotsalainen – drums (1999–2015, 2020–present)

Former members
 Toni Mäensivu – drums (1995–1999), vocals (1998–2001)
 Pasi Koskinen – vocals (2001–2010)
 Daniel Neagoe – drums (2015–2019)

Timeline

Discography

Albums
 Shades of...  (2000 - Spikefarm Records, Reissued in 2006 by Season of Mist)
 Angels of Distress (September 25, 2001 - Spikefarm Records, Relapse Records)
 Illusion's Play (September 27, 2004 - Spikefarm Records, Reissued in 2005 by Season of Mist)
 Monotony Fields (June 15, 2015 - Season of Mist)
 Alone in the Mist (December 9, 2016 - Season of Mist)
 Return to the Void (February 25, 2022 - Season of Mist)

EPs
 Written in My Scars (October 31, 2010 - Solarfall Records)
 Shape of Despair / Before the Rain (June 30, 2011 - Avantgarde Music)

Compilation albums
 Shape of Despair (August 3, 2005 - Spikefarm Records, Reissued in 2006 by Season of Mist)

Demos
 Rehearsal I (1995, as Raven, instrumental demo with 2 songs)
 Rehearsal II (1995, as Raven, instrumental demo with 5 songs)
 Alone In The Mist (recorded in 1998 as Raven, though never officially released as Raven, released in 2016 by Season of Mist under Shape Of Despair)
 Promo 1998 (1998, as Raven)

References

External links
Official website
Shape of Despair at Myspace.com
Shape of Despair at last.fm

Finnish doom metal musical groups
Musical groups established in 1995
Season of Mist artists
Funeral doom musical groups